The Hermann Oberth Society is an association named after Hermann Oberth, the German astronautics pioneer and the authoritative expert on rocketry outside the United States, which develops and builds rockets and trains engineers in space technology.

The Society was established in 1952 by Karl Poggensee in Bremen as the German Agency For Affairs of Space Travel (DAFRA), tasked to develop civilian rockets. Early on in Hespenbusch, near Großenkneten, various prototype rockets were developed, which soon reached heights of a few kilometers. The available area in Hespenbusch quickly became too small to continue to conduct rocket tests there.

In 1957 the rocket experiments of DAFRA, which was renamed the DRG (German rocket company), moved to Cuxhaven, where rocket tests were resumed in 1959. On December 15, 1960, the first launch of the Kumulus, which had a maximum height of 20 kilometres, took place and on September 16, 1961, the first launch of the Cirrus, which had a maximum height of 50 kilometers, took place.

At this time Berthold Seliger began to build rockets in this society, which was renamed the Hermann Oberth society. In 1961 Berthold Seliger created his own company, the Seliger Forschungs- und Entwicklungsgesellschaft mbH, which cooperated with the Hermann Oberth society. The Seliger Forschungs- und Entwicklungsgesellschaft mbH developed several two- and three-stage rockets, which could reach heights of up to 150 kilometers, between 1962 and 1963. After a disputed flight demonstration of the Seliger Forschungs- und Entwicklungsgesellschaft mbH militarily usable rockets before military representatives from non-NATO states at Cuxhaven on December 5, 1963, a break between the Seliger Forschungs- und Entwicklungsgesellschaft mbH and the Hermann Oberth society occurred. The latter continued to make rocket launches until June 1964.

After the termination of rocket launches in the Cuxhaven area the Hermann Oberth society put its emphasis on the education of future space technology engineers. In 1993 the Hermann Oberth society and the Otto Lilienthal society united to form the German Society for Air and Space Technology, DGLR.

References

Human spaceflight